The Flying Graysons are fictional characters appearing in American comic books published by DC Comics. They are a family of trapeze artists, whose child Dick is adopted by Bruce Wayne (Batman) and becomes Robin after their deaths. 

The Flying Graysons have been featured in several media adaptions outside of comics, commonly as part of Robin's origin story.

Fictional team history
The Flying Graysons are a group of trapeze artists consisting of father John, mother Mary, and son Dick Grayson. They worked at Haly's Circus and were famed for always working without a net. During a trapeze show, crime boss Tony Zucco sabotaged their trapeze in retaliation for Mr. Haly not paying him protection money, resulting in John and Mary's death. Following the accident, Mr. Haly paid the money he owed to Zucco. Bruce Wayne was at the circus at the time and witnessed the accident. Remembering what had happened to him as a child, he decided to take in the young Dick. Eventually, Bruce officially adopted Dick and, after revealing his identity as the superhero Batman to him, the latter became his sidekick, Robin. Batman and Robin then avenged the latter's parents by bringing Zucco to justice.

In the Bronze Age, a few years after the death of John and Mary Grayson, Haly's Circus created an all-new Flying Graysons, but one of them was a criminal and was captured by Robin.

During the "Blackest Night" storyline, John and Mary Grayson were brought back from death by the Black Lantern rings and attacked Dick, Tim Drake and Damian Wayne.

Other versions
 In Frank Miller's All Star Batman & Robin, the Boy Wonder on Earth-31, they appear in the first issue.
 An alternate timeline version of the Flying Graysons appears in Flashpoint.
 An Earth-37 Thrillkiller version of John, Mary and Dick Grayson are Petra Graustark, Johan Graustark and Rickart Graustark.
 The Flying Graysons appears in the Lil Gotham comics.
 The Flying Graysons appear in the Batman & Robin Adventures comic (based on Batman: The Animated Series).
 A poster of the Flying Graysons appears in Teen Titans Go! #47.
 The Flying Graysons appear in issue #6 of the Young Justice comics. They are featured in a flashback when Robin recaps his history. This version of the Flying Graysons also consisted of Richard "Rick" Grayson (John's brother), Rick's wife Karla, and their son John II. While John, Mary, Karla, and John II were killed in the trapeze accident caused by Tony Zucco, Rick survived and was paralyzed from the fall.

In other media

Television
 The Flying Graysons appears in the Batman: The Animated Series two-part episode "Robin's Reckoning", with John and Mary Grayson voiced by Thomas F. Wilson and Diane Pershing, both uncredited. When Mr. Haly refuses to pay protection money to Tony Zucco, the Flying Graysons' trapeze set is sabotaged when the ropes break during a performance. Bruce Wayne adopts Dick Grayson after his parents' death.
 The Grayson's deaths appear briefly in a flashback in the Teen Titans episode "Haunted".
 The Flying Graysons appears in The Batman episode "A Matter of Family" with John and Mary Grayson voiced by Kevin Conroy and Grey DeLisle. In this show, John also doubles as the manager of Haly's Circus. The family is confronted by Tony Zucco and his brothers who want them to pay protection money which also results in Batman showing up. Zucco vows revenge after one of his brothers is arrested, and secretly removes the nuts from the trapeze. Before Dick can join in on the trapeze act during the circus event, Mary notices something wrong with the trapeze as it comes apart. Mary's final word as she and John fell is "Dick". When Dick later became Robin, he rescues Batman from Zucco's trap and helps bring Zucco to justice.
 A poster of the Flying Graysons appears in the Young Justice episode "Performance".
 John and Mary appear in the Gotham episode "The Blind Fortune Teller" with John Grayson portrayed by Rob Gorrie and Mary by Abbi Snee. While John Grayson and the Flying Graysons are the acrobats, Mary started out as Mary Lloyd whose family worked as circus clowns. During a circus show, the Graysons led by John's brother Alphonse Grayson (Slate Holmgren) and the Lloyds led by Mary's uncle Owen Lloyd (Jeremy Bobb) feud over John and Mary's relationship until it is broken up by James Gordon. Owen mentions to Gordon that their feud with the Flying Graysons had started when Alphonse accused Owen's great-grandfather Barry of stealing a horse. After Lila Valeska is found murdered, Alphonse and Owen are the likely suspects. When Jerome Valeska is apprehended as the real culprit, the two families reconcile as John and Mary plan on getting married. They thank Jim Gordon for his help and promise to name their son after him.
 John and Mary Grayson are mentioned in Teen Titans Go! episodes "Let's Get Serious" and "Batman v Teen Titans: Dark Injustice" before appearing in Robin's imagination in "Rad Dudes with Bad Tudes", with John and Mary Grayson voiced by Greg Cipes and Tara Strong.
 The ancestors of John Grayson appear in the Legends of Tomorrow episode "Freakshow" as a members of P. T. Barnum's traveling circus.
 The Flying Graysons appear in the Titans in various flashbacks with Mary and John Grayson portrayed by April Brown Chodkowski and Randolf Hobbs.

Film
The Flying Graysons appear in Batman Forever with John Grayson portrayed by Larry A. Lee and Mary Grayson by Glory Fioramonti. In this version, the Flying Graysons are not a trio, but rather a quartet, with the fourth member being Dick's older brother Mitch (portrayed by Chris O'Donnell's stunt double Mitch Gaylord). During a performance, Two-Face infiltrates the circus where they are working and creates a hostage situation, threatening to detonate a bomb unless Batman surrenders himself. The Graysons manage to get rid of the bomb, throwing it into the river, but Two-Face kills John, Mary, and Mitch by destroying the trapeze set before escaping.

Video games
Flying Graysons posters appear throughout the games Batman: Arkham City and Batman: Arkham Origins.

References

External links
 

Characters created by Bill Finger
Characters created by Bob Kane
Dick Grayson
Fictional families
Fictional trapeze artists